Addison Steiner (born December 19, 1994) is an American professional soccer player who last played as a striker for Reign FC of the National Women's Soccer League.

Early life
Steiner was born in Prairie Village, Kansas, and finished her collegiate career with Hawai'i Rainbow Wahine in 2016.

Club career
After starting her professional career with Östersunds DFF, Steiner moved to KIF Örebro and helped the club win promotion to the first-division Damallsvenskan in 2018.

On May 23, 2019, Reign FC signed Steiner as a National Team Replacement player on loan from KIF Örebro. Steiner made four substitute appearances for Reign FC before the two clubs agreed to make the loan permanent on July 15, 2019.

On January 18, 2020, Steiner announced that she would be leaving Reign FC and taking time off from professional soccer.

References

External links
 
 Northwestern Wildcats profile
 Hawai'i Rainbow Wahine profile

OL Reign players
1994 births
Living people
American women's soccer players
National Women's Soccer League players
KIF Örebro DFF players
Damallsvenskan players
Northwestern Wildcats women's soccer players
Hawaii Rainbow Wahine soccer players
Women's association football forwards
21st-century American women